Benjamin Michael Provencial is an American singer-songwriter.

References 

1993 births
Living people
American singer-songwriters
21st-century American singers